Drobe (also referred to as Drobe Launchpad) was a computing news web site with a focus on the  operating system. Its archived material was retained online, curated by editor Chris Williams until late 2020.

History

Drobe was founded in 1999 by Peter Price. In 2001, Peter handed the site over to Chris Williams as editor. After , it closed as a news site in 2009. It was retained as an historical archive until 2020 when the site went offline. A few weeks after the site's closure Williams posted articles on Micro Men, the television drama about the rivalry between Acorn and Sinclair in the 1980s. He subsequently stated that such articles may continue to appear periodically.

Main features

At launch, the site featured a news feed, POP email checker and a search facility "incorporating AcornSearch.com". , the site features archived  articles, news and other media. It also hosts an online emulator for the BBC Micro, using the Java Runtime Environment.

Registered users were able to apply for user webspace in order to host their own projects. These subsites continue to be hosted by Drobe.

See also

 The Icon Bar

References

Subsites

Drobe
 BBC Micro emulator
 File archives (mirrors of popular FTP sites, etc.)
 Reference material (various /Acorn hardware)

Selected user sites

 
 
 
  (ROLF (software), the  look and feel on Linux)

External links
 Diodesign (Editor/curator Chris Williams's website)
 Drobe article statistics
  (subdomain hosting, adopted by Drobe)
 

Computing websites
History of computing
Free-content websites
British news websites
RISC OS